The Four Musketeers is a 1934 German drama film directed by Heinz Paul and starring Fritz Kampers, Paul Westermeier and Erhard Siedel. It was shot at the Terra Studios in Berlin. The film's art direction was by Robert A. Dietrich.

Synopsis
Four comrades of the First World War meet up many years later and discover they have very different views on the political future of Germany.

Cast
 Fritz Kampers as Musketier Schlumberger aus Bayern
 Paul Westermeier as Musketier Stempel aus Berlin
 Erhard Siedel as Musketier Krause aus Sachsen
 Hans Brausewetter as Musketier Gisevius aus Hamburg
 Hermann Speelmans as Gefreiter Eberle
 Werner Schott as Hauptmann der Kompanie
 Fritz Odemar as Ortskommandant
 Friedrich Ettel as Feldwebel Hülsebeck
 Liselotte Schaak as Hildegard Gievius
 Agnes Straub as Frau Schlumberger
 Martha Ziegler as Fräulein Meyer
 Carsta Löck as Minna
 Arthur Reinhardt as Kompanie-Feldwebel
 Gustav Püttjer as Kommandantur-Ordonanz
 Hans Albin as Ein Leutnant
 Ernst Behmer as Ein Hotelportier
 Renée Burzat as Eine Französin
 Peter Erkelenz as Divisionsadjutant
 Käthe Haack as Frau Krause
 Willy Mendau as Ordonanzoffizier Schmidt
 Leo Peukert as Proviantamts-Inspektor

References

Bibliography

External links 
 

1934 films
1934 drama films
German drama films
1930s German-language films
Films directed by Heinz Paul
Films of Nazi Germany
Terra Film films
German black-and-white films
1930s German films
Films shot at Terra Studios